Savannah Law School was a private, for-profit law school in Savannah, Georgia. It was associated with Atlanta's John Marshall Law School. The school ceased all operations by 2021 and is no longer accepting applications.

Campus

Savannah Law School began in the historic former Warren A. Candler Hospital building on Forsyth Park in downtown Savannah.  Constructed in 1819 among 26 Seaman's hospitals chartered by an Act of Congress in 1791, the building is the oldest hospital in the state of Georgia, and was used as such until 1980.  The building served as both a Confederate and Union hospital during the Civil War. Several tenants occupied the building sporadically from 1980 until 2009.

In 2012, the Historic Preservation Board approved Savannah Law School's comprehensive restoration of the 110,000 square foot facility.  The renovations met federal historic preservation standards and were completed in 2014. The project represents one of the largest efforts to restore an historic property in the United States. In 2015, The Victorian Society in America and the Savannah Historic Preservation Board honored Savannah Law School with Preservation Awards for the renovation.  The building was sold to Savannah College of Art and Design in 2018 and precipitated the shutdown of the law school.

The Candler Oak Tree is located on the campus.  In 2004, it was placed on the National Register of Historic Trees. At approximately 300 years of age, it is thought to be one of the oldest living landmarks in the region. The Savannah Tree Foundation holds a conservation easement to the tree and helps care for the tree along with the law school.  The law school adopted the tree as its logo.

Statistics
Savannah Law School had an 8-to-1 student-to-faculty ratio.  The median LSAT score of the entire 1L class is 151; however, the median score of the full-time program is 153 and that of the part-time program is 149.  21% of the 2014 entering class are minorities, 17% are military veterans, 71% are women, and 64% are from out-of-state.

Admissions
Savannah Law School is no longer accepting applications for admission.

Savannah Law Review
The Savannah Law Review is a law review published by Savannah Law School students twice a year. It is a member of the National Conference of Law Reviews.

Savannah Law Review hosts an annual colloquium. In September 2014, the Savannah Law Review hosted the (Re)Integrating Spaces colloquium to celebrate the historic renovations at the law school. The colloquium featured national scholars and local practitioners. In September 2015, Savannah Law Review hosted The Walking Dead, which surveyed academic topics regarding how death and fear of death affect the law of the living. In 2016, Savannah Law Review presented American Legal Fictions, a colloquium examining the role of legal fictions in shaping the law. In 2017, Savannah Law Review hosted Rise of the Automatons, a colloquium examining the legal implications of automation in society.

Savannah Law Review has published nationally and internationally respected scholars and local practitioners. Its colloquia and publication brought national attention to both the Journal and Savannah Law School.

Student organizations
A number of student organizations are active at Savannah Law School. Student groups include:
 American Association for Justice
 American Constitution Society
 Environmental Law Society
 Federalist Society
 Law Students of the Lowcountry
 Maritime Law Society
 Mock Trial
 Moot Court Honor Board
 National Black Law Students Association
 National Women Law Students' Organization
 OfFitness Intermeddlers
 OUTLaws & Allies
 Phi Alpha Delta - Telfair Chapter
 Savannah Law Review
 Savannah Law Veterans Association
 Student Bar Association
 The Tunnel: Law and Humanities Society

Relationship to AJMLS
The law school was first opened by Atlanta's John Marshall Law School in the 1970s, but the campus was discontinued in the 1980s. The American Bar Association approved the law school's re-establishment as a branch of AJMLS on December 5, 2011, and the class of 2015 enrolled in August 2012. The American Bar Association defines a branch as "the creation of a different law school."

References

External links
 Official website

Educational institutions established in 2011
Law schools in Georgia (U.S. state)
Universities and colleges in Savannah, Georgia
Private universities and colleges in Georgia (U.S. state)
Education in Chatham County, Georgia
Independent law schools in the United States
2011 establishments in Georgia (U.S. state)
Defunct law schools
Educational institutions disestablished in 2021
2021 disestablishments in Georgia (U.S. state)